Median raphe cysts are a cutaneous condition of the penis due to developmental defects near the glans.

See also 
 Cutaneous columnar cyst
 List of cutaneous conditions

References 

Cutaneous congenital anomalies